Ronald Arthur Gaunt (26 February 1934 – 31 March 2012) was an Australian cricketer who played in three Test matches between 1958 and 1964.

He was chiefly a fast bowler, who took 266 wickets in first-class cricket at an average of 26.85, playing first for Western Australia and then for Victoria. His opportunities to play for Australia were restricted by the presence of Alan Davidson, Garth McKenzie and Ian Meckiff in the team at that time, but he took the wicket of Dick Westcott in his first over in test cricket and in all he took 7 wickets for Australia at an average of 44.28.

After he retired from playing, he became a successful coach and was involved in the development of Merv Hughes and Tony Dodemaide among others. He later took up golf and was an active member of the Eastern Golf Club at Doncaster in Victoria for many years.

References 

1934 births
2012 deaths
Australia Test cricketers
Western Australia cricketers
Victoria cricketers
People from York, Western Australia
Australian cricketers
Australian cricket coaches
Cricketers from Western Australia